William Rea (1912–2006) was an American real estate magnate and civic leader in Pittsburgh, Pennsylvania.

He was a key collaborator with H. J. Heinz II in the creation of Pittsburgh's Cultural District, and he served leadership roles on the boards of the Pennsylvania State Board of Education, Pittsburgh Public Schools, the University of Pittsburgh, Princeton University, and the Heinz Endowments.

Rea grew up in the Squirrel Hill neighborhood of Pittsburgh.  He graduated from Princeton University and began his career as an English teacher at the American University of Beirut, then took on management roles at Edgewater Steel Company and W. R. Grace and Company. His real estate development career was with the Henry W. Oliver Estate.  In his later years, Rea lived in Stahlstown, Pennsylvania.

References
Sally Kalson (2006). Obituary: William Rea, civic leader and one of the Cultural District's creators, dies at 94. Retrieved May 24, 2006.

Academic staff of the American University of Beirut
1912 births
2006 deaths